Jeff MacPherson (born June 9, 1956, in Santa Ana, California), is a former driver in the CART Championship Car series.  He raced in the 1986 and 1987 seasons, with 18 career starts, including the 1987 Indianapolis 500.  He finished in the top ten 5 times, with his best finish in 8th position in 1987 at both Indianapolis and Milwaukee. He also finished 8th in the 1987 championship. Prior to CART, he raced in US Formula Super Vee in 1984 and 1985 and drove in four races (and had 3 DNQ's) in the FIA Formula 3000 series in 1986 for the short-lived Bennett team with a best finish of 8th at Silverstone.

External links
Jeff MacPherson at ChampCarStats

1956 births
Champ Car drivers
Living people
Indianapolis 500 drivers
Sportspeople from Santa Ana, California
Racing drivers from California

International Formula 3000 drivers